The 34th UIT World Shooting Championships was the contemporary name of the ISSF World Shooting Championships held in Buenos Aires, Argentina, in 1949.

Medal count

Rifle events

Pistol events

Shotgun events

Running target events

References 
 All WCH medallists (ISSF website)

ISSF World Shooting Championships
Sports festivals in Argentina
Sports competitions in Buenos Aires
ISSF
1949 in Argentine sport
1940s in Buenos Aires
Shooting competitions in Argentina